Le Silence de la mer (The Silence of the Sea) is a French novel written during the summer of 1941 and published in early 1942 by Jean Bruller under the pseudonym "Vercors".  Published secretly in German-occupied Paris, the book quickly became a symbol of mental resistance against German occupiers.

Plot summary
In the book, Vercors tells of how an old man and his niece show resistance against the German occupiers by not speaking to the officer who is occupying their house. The German officer is a former composer, dreaming of brotherhood between the French and German nations, deluded by the Nazi propaganda of that period. He is disillusioned when he realizes the real goal of the German army is not to build but to ruin and to exploit. He then chooses to leave France to fight on the Eastern Front, cryptically declaring he is "off to Hell."

Adaptations
The book was translated into English by Cyril Connolly and published in 1944 under the title Put Out the Light.

An English-language adaptation called The Silence of the Sea was transmitted by the BBC TV service on 7 June 1946 as part of their first evening's programming following the resumption of TV broadcasting after the end of World War II. 

A French-language film, Le Silence de la mer, based on the book and directed by Jean-Pierre Melville, was released in 1949. 

A second English-language TV adaptation was broadcast by the BBC in 1981, and a stage version by John Crowther was performed by The Heywood Society in the theatre at Peterhouse, Cambridge, in 1985, with the (presumably ironic) title Talking in the Night.

Le Silence de la Mer (2004), a French–Belgian TV movie based on the novel by Vercors, was shot from 1 to 28 April 2004 in Tusson and directed by Pierre Boutron for France 2 television. This film was awarded at the Festival of Fiction of Saint-Tropez in 2004 three awards: best TV film, best female (Julie Delarme) and best music (Angélique et Jean-Claude Nachon). The actors are Julie Delarme (Jeanne Larosière), Michel Galabru (André Larosière), Thomas Jouannet (Werner Von Ebrennac), Marie Bunel (Marie), Timothée Ferrand (Pierre).

In 2013, a new English version by Anthony Weigh was staged at the Trafalgar Studios theatre in London as part of the Donmar Trafalgar season, starring Leo Bill, Simona Bitmate, and Finbar Lynch. Simon Evans directed.

See also

Underground media in German-occupied Europe
Code Name Melville
French Resistance
Le Monde 100 Books of the Century
Les Éditions de Minuit
Suite Française, another novel with a German composer/officer character quartered in a French home during World War II.
Vichy France

References

1942 French novels
French resistance publications
Les Éditions de Minuit books
Novels set in France
Underground press in World War II
Works published under a pseudonym
Novels set during World War II